Springs Toledo is a writer and author. His work has been featured in Ploughshares, Salon, City Journal, Boxing News, and THE RING magazine, The Sweet Science, Plough, and Mizan. He is also a member of the Boxing Writers Association of America (BWAA), International Boxing Hall of Fame Committee, and Ring 4 Boston. Toledo was born and raised in Boston, Massachusetts and appeared on the Discovery channel and in the movie I Am Duran (2019). His work was featured on NPR's "Here and Now" and earned him over 40 BWAA writing awards between 2010 and 2022. He is the author of The Gods of War (Tora 2014, 2019), In the Cheap Seats (Tora 2016),, Murderers' Row (Tora 2017, 2020), and Smokestack Lightning: Harry Greb, 1919 (2019). Toledo is one of the founding members of the Transnational Boxing Rankings Board and serves as a contributing member and in the role of Oversight.

See also
Transnational Boxing Rankings Board
The Ring magazine
Boxing Writers Association of America

References

External links
 Springs Toledo – BWAA

Sports historians
Boxing writers
Year of birth missing (living people)
Sportspeople from Boston
Living people